Siler may refer to:
 Siler (spider), a genus of jumping spiders
 Siler (Stargate), a character in the Stargate franchise
 Siler, Virginia, an unincorporated community in Frederick County, Virginia
 Siler City, North Carolina
 Siler (plant), a genus in the family Apiaceae.

People with the family name Siler
 Brandon Siler, American football linebacker
 Eugene Siler, American politician
 Howard Siler, American bobsledder
 Joseph Franklin Siler, U.S. Army physician and dengue researcher
 Lester Eugene Siler, convicted drug dealer
 Owen W. Siler, admiral in the United States Coast Guard
 Ronald Siler, American amateur boxer
 Todd Siler, American visual artist, author, educator and inventor

See also
 Sylar, a villain in the TV series Heroes